Ban Zu or Banzu (Malay: Pancur) was a port settlement believed to have thrived in Singapore during the 14th century. It is thought to be located on Fort Canning Hill and the area on the north bank of the Singapore River basin between the hill and the sea. It was mentioned by the Chinese traveller Wang Dayuan in his work Daoyi Zhilüe together with Long Ya Men as the two settlements that made up Temasek. It may have been abandoned before 1400 after an attack by either the Siamese or the Majapahit.

Name
Ban Zu is likely a Chinese transcription of the Malay word pancur meaning "spring of water". Pancur is a common placename in the region. Fansur (Pansur) in Sumatra was known to the Arabs in the 10th century, and Fansur was also the name of a capital of Johor in the 16th century. A spring used to exist on the west side of Fort Canning Hill, called pancur larangan or "forbidden spring" in Malay, where the women of the royal household in old Singapura were said to bathe in.

Historical accounts
Historical information on Ban Zu comes from the Yuan dynasty work Daoyi Zhilüe written by Wang Dayuan.  Ban Zu was described as being located behind on a hill behind Long Ya Men of Temasek. Its relationship with Long Ya Men is uncertain, and the descriptions of the people in Banzu and Long Ya Men are different, including their clothing. While the people of Long Ya Men were said to be prone to acts of piracy, the people of Ban Zu were described as honest.                                                                                              

Wang reported that the local produce of Ban Zu were hornbill casques, lakawood of medium quality, and cotton. They traded in silk cloths, iron bars, local cotton prints, red gold, porcelain, and iron utensils.

Wang's accounts suggest that the city of Temasek was moated and gated, and that the Siamese attacked the city moat of Temasek with around 70 ships a few years before he visited.  The city however successfully resisted the attack for a month until the Siamese left when Javanese envoys happened to pass by.

Descriptions and archaeology

Ban Zu is believed by some scholars to be located on today's Fort Canning Hill and its nearby areas. Ruins of an old city in Singapore were still visible by the early 19th century, but have since been obliterated by the development of Singapore. Stamford Raffles mentioned the lines of the old city and its defences, and the British Resident John Crawfurd wrote about the ruins in some details. Crawfurd described in 1822 the ancient city as being roughly triangular in shape with a base of around a mile in length. A fresh water rivulet formed a kind of a moat alongside the wall. Although Wang Dayuan mentioned that Ban Zu was gated, no opening was apparent along this wall according to Crawfurd. Crawfurd also noted the remains of buildings, some of brick foundation, on the west and northern side of Fort Canning Hill. Among these are ruins of a terrace  square near the top of the hill that he took to be a temple, with another terrace almost as big on the northern slope of the hill that local Malays believed to be the tomb of Iskandar Shah (who actually died in Malacca). Crawfurd also mentioned ancient fruit trees cultivated in the gardens, and found pottery fragments and Chinese coins, the earliest of which were dated to 10th century Song Dynasty.

In 1928, a cache of Javanese-styled gold ornaments dating to the mid-14th century were discovered at Fort Canning Hill while the Fort Canning reservoir was being excavated. These include a pair of near-identical flexible armlets, a ring, three pairs of rings (perhaps earrings), an ornament, and a jewelled clasp. Some of these including the clasp were lost during the Japanese occupation of Singapore in the Second World War.

Archaeological excavations were conducted on Fort Canning by John Miksic in 1984,  later expanded to nearby area bounded by the hill, the banks of the Singapore River and the sea, such as the Parliament House Complex, Empress Place and other locations.  The excavations confirmed the presence of a thriving settlement and a trade port here during the 14th century.  The artefacts found show that Fort Canning Hill was occupied by the elites, with perhaps a royal palace. It was also the location of artisanal workshops where glass may be recycled, as well as religious activities, although it was not a major ceremonial center.  The entire Fort Canning Hill area therefore may have been once dotted with various buildings of political, religious and commercial significance. In areas near the hill, evidence of commercial activities and metal working have been found. Analyses of Chinese porcelain found indicate occupation of the site from the late 13th to mid-15th century, while evidence of earthenware manufacture may date the existence of a settlement to the 12th century. The royal centre on Fort Canning Hill may have been abandoned before 1400 after the attacks by either the Siamese or the Majapahit as suggested by historical accounts.

See also
History of Singapore
Kingdom of Singapura
Archaeology in Singapore

References

History of Singapore